The 1945 season was the Chicago Bears' 26th in the National Football League.  The team failed to improve on their 6–3–1 record from 1944 and finished at  1–7, under temporary co-coaches Hunk Anderson and Luke Johnsos. With the end of World War II, Halas would make his return to the coaching ranks--winning the bears final 2 games, and improving their record to 3-7--so this was the end of the only co-coaching tenure in franchise history. 

This was also their first losing season in 16 years, with their last being back in 1929 (they were above .500 every season between 1920 and 1928). And they would not have another, with Halas at the helm, until 1960. Meaning that between 1920 and 1963, Halas had only 2 losing seasons.

Schedule

Standings

References

Chicago Bears
Chicago Bears seasons
Chicago Bears